The Aero Dynamics Sparrow Hawk MK II is an American homebuilt, two seater, single-engine, pusher monoplane, manufactured by Aero Dynamics Limited. It was designed by former Boeing design engineer Charles "Chuck" Herbst.

Design and development
The Sparrow Hawk is a twin boom, twin fin, ultralight aircraft built with mixed construction materials most notably including Kevlar, carbon fiber and polyurethane foam. It uses a Rotax 532 two-stroke aircraft engine in pusher configuration. It employs a cantilever, shoulder wing, fixed landing gear and a two-seat enclosed cockpit.

In 2022, Sparrow Hawk Aviation Ltd had plans to redesign and improve the Sparrow Hawk.

Operational history
The Sparrow Hawk had its official public debut in July 1985 at the EAA Annual Convention and Fly-In, as two Sparrow Hawks, registered as N5793F and N5832M, attended. The manufacturer and model of N5793F is recorded by the Federal Aviation Administration (FAA) as an "Ultralight Aircraft Ltd Sparrow Hawk Mk II", while N5832M is recorded as an "Aero Dynamics Ltd Sparrow Hawk MkII".

A Sparrow Hawk (registered N8728A) was displayed at the Air Display and Air Races event at Cranfield Aerodrome in the United Kingdom, on 20 September 1987. The same aircraft was exhibited at the SBAC-organized Farnborough Airshow in September 1988.

Aircraft on display
Oakland Aviation Museum - Sparrow Hawk N23SH.

Specifications

References 

Shoulder-wing aircraft
Single-engined pusher aircraft
1980s United States ultralight aircraft
Aero Dynamics Limited aircraft
Homebuilt aircraft